The 1993 UST Growling Tigers men's basketball team represented University of Santo Tomas in the 56th season of the University Athletic Association of the Philippines. The men's basketball tournament for the school year 1993–94 began on July 17, 1993, and the host school for the season was Far Eastern University.

The Tigers went undefeated with a 14–0 record, in the year that was supposedly the first time that the Final Four semifinal playoff format was to take place in the UAAP tournament. Existing league rules stipulated that a team that wins all their games in the double round-robin eliminations is declared automatic champion, making UST the winners for the first time since their shared championship with the UE Red Warriors in 1967.

They had an average winning margin of 15.8 points with five blowout wins over the Ateneo Blue Eagles, the NU Bulldogs, and the UP Fighting Maroons. UST won twice over Ateneo by 27 and 28 points in each elimination rounds. They also defeated NU in both rounds with deficits of 31 and 27 points, and had a 32-point lead in their win against UP in the second round.

Dennis Espino was named Season MVP, and together with Rey Evangelista and team captain Patrick Fran, they were selected to the Mythical first team. Udoy Belmonte was included in the second team.

Roster

Depth chart

Roster changes 
The Tigers' starting point guard Binky Favis and national team members Rene Cabaluna and Jay Torres have already graduated and are replaced by two rookies, a transferee, and a returning player. UST has managed to recruit point guard Taddy Ramos from the Mapúa Cardinals, the 1991 NCAA champions for a one-and-done season. The 6-6  center Chris Cantonjos, out of the Letran Knights juniors basketball team was scouted by the Tigers' assistant coach Mady Tabora during one of his PBL team's tune-up games. Tabora, who was the coach of the Burger Machine team invited Cantonjos to try out with UST and is now included in this season's lineup.

Subtractions

Additions

Coaching staff 
Assistant coach and team trainer Mady Tabora died from a heart attack in the offseason while on vacation in his hometown in Cebu City. The former Glowing Goldie who was also the head coach of UST's high school basketball team was replaced by the recently graduated Binky Favis as Aric del Rosario's deputy.

Schedule and results

Preseason tournaments

UAAP games 

Elimination games were played in a double round-robin format. All games were aired on RPN 9 by Silverstar Sports.

Postseason tournament

Awards

Players drafted into the PBA

References 

UST Growling Tigers basketball team seasons
UAAP Season 56